Iva Todorić (born 24 March 1993 in Imotski, Croatia) is a Croatian female basketball player.

External links
Profile at eurobasket.com

Living people
1993 births
Sportspeople from Imotski
Croatian women's basketball players
Small forwards
Croatian Women's Basketball League players